Women's eight competition at the 2008 Summer Olympics in Beijing was held on August 11 (heats), 13 (Repechage) and 17 (Final A), at the Shunyi Olympic Rowing-Canoeing Park.

This rowing event is a sweep rowing event, meaning that each rower has one oar and rows on only one side. Eight rowers and one coxswain crew each boat. The seven teams competing are placed into two heats, of four and three boats each. The fastest boat in each of those heats moves directly on to the final, while the rest of the boats are sent to the repechage. The repechage is a single heat, with the top four of the five boats advancing to the final. The repechage loser is given an overall rank of 7th place, last in the event. The other six boats, competing in the final, are ranked according to their finish in the final.

Schedule
All times are China Standard Time (UTC+8)

Results

Heats
Qualification Rules: 1->FA, 2..->R

Heat 1

Heat 2

Repechage
Qualification Rules: 1-4 ->FA

Final A

References

External links
NYT Olympic Report

Rowing at the 2008 Summer Olympics
Women's rowing at the 2008 Summer Olympics
Women's events at the 2008 Summer Olympics